Viktor Vida (October 2, 1913 – September 25, 1960) was a Croatian writer.

Early life
Vida was born in Kotor. After completing his matura in Podgorica in 1932, he moved with his parents to Zagreb, where he graduated from the University of Zagreb in south Slav literature, Italian language and literature, and French and Russian. From 1939, he worked as a librarian in the Institute of Italian Culture in Zagreb.

His first poetry was published in Slobodna misao weekly in Nikšić.

Emigration
From 1943 he worked in Rome. He emigrated to Buenos Aires with his family in 1948. In Argentina he contributed to the Croatian emigrant publication Hrvatska revija.

His poetry is in the bohemian tradition of Antun Gustav Matoš and Tin Ujević, which he was inspired by after meeting the circle of writers around Ljubo Wiesner and Nikica Polić.

He committed suicide in Buenos Aires on September 25, 1960. His tombstone in the La Chacarita cemetery bears the inscription "Ars longa, vita brevis".

Legacy
With Croatian independence in 1991, there was renewed availability and interest in his work. The Association of Croatian Writers held an academic conference on him in 1993.

Works 
Poetry collections:
 Svemir osobe (Buenos Aires, 1951)
 Sužanj vremena (Buenos Aires, 1956)
 Sabrane pjesme (Buenos Aires, 1962)
 Otrovane lokve (Zagreb, 1971)
 Izabrane pjesme (Zagreb, 1994)
Non-fiction:
 Otključana škrinjica (Zagreb, 1997)

References

Bibliography

Further reading
 
 
 

1913 births
1960 suicides
20th-century Croatian poets
Croatian male poets
Croats of Montenegro
People from Kotor
20th-century Croatian people
Croatian emigrants to Argentina
Croatian people of Montenegrin descent
20th-century male writers
Suicides in Argentina
Croatian expatriates in Italy